Events from the year 1743 in Ireland.

Incumbent
Monarch: George II

Events
c. April – radical apothecary Charles Lucas publishes his pamphlet A Remonstrance against certain Infringements on the Rights and Liberties of the Commons and Citizens of Dublin, arguing that the right of electing Aldermen for Dublin lies with the entire Corporation.
15 June – Arthur Jones-Nevill is appointed Surveyor General of Ireland in succession to Arthur Dobbs.

Births
16 April – William Beresford, 1st Baron Decies, Church of Ireland Archbishop of Tuam (died 1819)
16 June – Aedanus Burke, soldier, judge, and United States Representative from South Carolina (died 1802)
3 October – Henry Prittie, 1st Baron Dunalley, politician (died 1801)
Joseph Atkinson, dramatist (died 1818)
Henry Vaughan Brooke, politician (died 1807)
James Gandon, architect (died 1823)
Edward Hudson, dentist (died 1821)
Approximate date – William Creed, politician and merchant in British North America (died 1809)

Deaths
11 April – Sir John Osborne, 7th Baronet, politician.
3 June – Henry Hamilton, politician (born 1692)
16 June – Henry Cairnes, politician (born 1673)
James Barry, politician (born 1689)
Price Hartstonge, politician (born 1692)

References

 
Years of the 18th century in Ireland
Ireland
1740s in Ireland